Paul Gauthier (February 21, 1901 – January 1, 1957) was a Canadian provincial politician.

Born in Montreal, Quebec, Gauthier was the member of the Legislative Assembly of Quebec for Montréal-Laurier from 1939 to 1944.

References

1901 births
1957 deaths
Politicians from Montreal
Quebec Liberal Party MNAs
Burials at Notre Dame des Neiges Cemetery